Leila Grace Williams is a Jamaican former cricketer who played primarily as an all-rounder, batting right-handed and bowling right-arm medium-fast. She appeared in five One Day Internationals for Jamaica at the 1973 World Cup, and eleven Test matches and one One Day International for the West Indies between 1976 and 1979. She also played domestic cricket for Jamaica.

References

External links
 
 

Living people
1947 births
West Indian women cricketers
West Indies women Test cricketers
West Indies women One Day International cricketers
Jamaican women cricketers